Benjamin Harvey Nelson (born 18 March 2004) is an English professional footballer who plays as a defender for League Two side Doncaster Rovers on loan from Premier League side Leicester City

Club career
In the 2020–21 season, Nelson featured in a first-team squad during Leicester City's UEFA Europa League campaign. He was named Academy Player of the Season at the end of the season.

On 28 July 2022, Nelson joined EFL League Two side Rochdale on a season-long loan. He was recalled from his loan on 6 January 2023. Later that month he joined Doncaster Rovers on loan for the remainder of the season.

International career
Nelson is eligible to play for either England or Scotland. After making one appearance for Scotland's under-16 team, he made his England U18 debut starting in a 3-2 defeat against the Netherlands on 11 November 2021.

On 21 September 2022, Nelson made his England U19 debut during a 2-0 2023 U19 EURO qualifying win over Montenegro.

Career statistics

Club

References

External links
 

2004 births
Living people
English footballers
English people of Scottish descent
Scottish footballers
Association football defenders
England youth international footballers
Scotland youth international footballers
English Football League players
Leicester City F.C. players
Rochdale A.F.C. players
Doncaster Rovers F.C. players